Hemlata Talesra (born 1 July 1944) is an Indian educationalist. She is a writer, researcher, teacher and holds administrative positions in many institutions in India and abroad.

She is a CCEAM Fellow, board member, Indian representative, chairman at Rajasthan Council of Educational Administration and Management (RCEAM), India, board member of World Constitution and Parliament Association (WCPA), Director at Smt. K. B. Dave College of Education, Pilvai, Gujarat, India, former Reader in Education at Center of Advanced Studies in Education, M. S. University, Broda, Gujarat, India, former Director-Research, Professor & Head department of education, Jain Vishva Bharti University, Ladnun, Rajasthan, India and former Professor Vidya Bhawan G.S. Teachers College, Udaipur, Rajasthan, India.

Awards and honours

Books 
List of English language books:
 (1989) Higher education among women by Hemlata Talesra, National. , 
 (1989) Tribal Education: A Quest for Integration in the Regional Mainstream by Hemlata Talesra, Himanshu Publications. , 
 (1994) Social Background of Tribal Girl Students by Hemlata Talesra, Himanshu Publications. , 
 (1997) Educational Management: Innovative Global Patterns by Hemlata Talesra, Satya Pal Ruhela, M. L. Nagda, Daya Books. , 
 (2001) Educational Leadership: Global Perspectives by Hemlata Talesra, Regency Publications. ,  
 (2001) Agenda for Education: Design and Direction by Hemlata Talesra, Kanishka Publishers Distributors. ,  
 (2002) Managing Educational Challenges: A Global View by Hemlata Talesra, P. K. Dashora, et al., Shima Sarupria, Authorspress. , 
 (2002) Development of Citizenship Habits Among Indigenous People by Hemlata Talesra, Indian Publishers & Distributors. , 
 (2002) Human Rights Education: A Global Perspective by Hemlata Talesra, Nalini Pancholy, Mangi Lal Nagda, Daya Books , 
 (2003) Challenges of Education: Technology Trends Globalisation by Hemlata Talesra, Maneesha Shukul, Uma Shanker Sharma, Authorspress. , 
 (2004) Scope and Trends of Research on Teaching by Hemlata Talesra, Authors Press. , 
 (2004) Education for the Survival of Human Race by Nilima Bhagabati, Hemlata Talesra, Authorspress. , .
 (2006) Sociological Foundations of Education by Hemlata Talesra, Kanishka Publishers. , 
 (2006) Cultural Heritage and Educational Initiatives by Hemlata Talesra, Authorspress. , 
 (2008) Integrating Theory and Praxis in Education by Hemlata Talesra, Authorspress. , 
List of Hindi language books:

 (2017) शिक्षा के समाजशास्त्रीय आधार (Sociological basis of education) by Hemlata Talesra, Rajasthan Hindi Granth Academy (RHGA). 
 (2020) शैक्षिक प्रबंधन प्रशासन एवं नेतृत्व (Educational Management Administration & Leadership) by Hemlata Talesra, Rajasthan Hindi Granth Academy (RHGA). .
 (2020) विद्यालयीकरण, समाजीकरण एवं पहचान (Schooling, Socialization and Identity) by Hemlata Talesra, Rajasthan Hindi Granth Academy (RHGA). .

See also 

 Rajasthan Council of Educational Administration and Management
 Commonwealth Council for Educational Administration and Management

References

External links 

 
 

Living people
Academic staff of Jain Vishva Bharati Institute
20th-century Indian educational theorists
21st-century Indian educational theorists
1944 births
Indian women educational theorists
Indian educational theorists
Peace award winners
20th-century Indian women writers
Academic staff of Maharaja Sayajirao University of Baroda